Pontiac Township is a township in Ozark County, in the U.S. state of Missouri.

Pontiac Township takes its name from the Ottawa Indian chief Pontiac.

References

	

Townships in Missouri
Townships in Ozark County, Missouri